The Great Eastern Ranges extends from southern Victoria to the north of Cairns in Queensland, Australia, encompassing the Great Dividing Range and the Great Escarpment – two very old, mountainous, sometimes undulating an occasional tableland landscapes situated on the eastern side of the continent.

Great Eastern Ranges Initiative
The Great Eastern Ranges Initiative is a program that establishes a conservation corridor along the New South Wales section of the Great Eastern Ranges. A conservation corridor is a strategically located area of land that links key habitats for plants and animals. While a wilderness corridor is an area in a relatively untouched natural environment, a conservation corridor may encompass a range of land uses — including agriculture, industry, and human settlement — in addition to areas protected as national parks or reserves.

The Great Eastern Ranges Initiative is a strategic response to lessen the potential negative impacts of climate change, land clearing, and other environmental stresses on Australia's richest biodiversity and the mountains that supply most of Australia's population with clean water. Current funding is focused on the  NSW section of the Great Eastern Ranges.

Although parts of the Great Eastern Ranges are well protected by national parks and reserves, much of the rich biodiversity along the ranges is found on private and public lands outside these protected areas. In NSW, 48% of the proposed corridor covers national parks and reserves, 37% is on private land and 16% is on other public lands such as state forests and Crown land.

Nature’s interconnected systems must be supported across the whole environment, not just in protected areas of the landscape. The Great Eastern Ranges Initiative is seeking to integrate conservation efforts on land adjacent and interconnecting with the existing reserve system. This will allow the habitats of plants and animals to be managed.

The Great Eastern Ranges Initiative focuses on raising community awareness and encouraging voluntary action by individuals and organizations. By building awareness of why the Great Eastern Ranges are so special and why conservation is important, the Great Eastern Ranges Initiative aims to inspire people to take action. At a local level, communities and landholders are encouraged to take action through regional partnerships, bringing together people and organizations in long-term relationships to conserve, connect, protect and rehabilitate the land.

Priority Areas
There are five priority areas along the ranges. Initially, on-ground activities are focused in the following regions — Border Ranges (northern NSW), Hunter Valley, Southern Highlands, Coast to Kosciuszko, and Slopes to Summit (around the Albury area of southern NSW).

Regional organizations are leading the Great Eastern Ranges Initiative in these areas. These include Greening Australia, OzGREEN, Nature Conservation Trust of New South Wales, the New South Wales Department of Environment, Climate Change & Water, and the National Parks Association of New South Wales.

In each area, a Facilitator coordinates regional partnerships to implement the voluntary involvement of landholders in local sections of the conservation corridor. Regional partnerships bring together a range of organizations, from catchment management authorities to local government, industry, conservation groups, Landcare bodies, scientists, and local landholders. Since 2007 over 50 organizations have participated in the Great Eastern Ranges Initiative. While some regional partnerships have been established since 2007, others are only just forming and identifying the key issues and activities for their region.

In some regional areas, a Facilitator acts as a conduit to bring together local conservation organizations, research bodies, government, government agencies, industry, and other groups to assess biodiversity values in local areas, then helps landholders access funding and support. In other regional areas, the focus is on conducting research—in conjunction with academic institutions and relevant state government bodies—to help determine priorities for the region.

References

External links
 http://www.greateasternranges.org.au
 http://www.environment.nsw.gov.au/ger/background.htm

Conservation projects